The Fellsmere Public School is a historic school in Fellsmere, Florida. It is located at 22 South Orange Street. On November 22, 1996, it was added to the U.S. National Register of Historic Places.

References

External links

 Indian River County listings at National Register of Historic Places
 Florida's Office of Cultural and Historical Programs
 Indian River County listings
 Great Floridians of Fellsmere

National Register of Historic Places in Indian River County, Florida
Buildings and structures in Indian River County, Florida
Vernacular architecture in Florida